The Code is the fifth extended play by the South Korean boy group Monsta X. It was released by Starship Entertainment and distributed by LOEN Entertainment on November 7, 2017. It consists of seven tracks, including the title track "Dramarama".

Background and release 
In October, Monsta X had announced the comeback, through the official SNS channel, alongside the personal photos of intense colors and visuals. In the released image, the dreamy color and close-up of each member's face were included in the background, with some sensuous typography and part of the seven logos for each member, while subsequently released the story images for each member, ahead of their comeback.

The group's comeback showcase was held at Jangchung Gymnasium in Jung District, Seoul on the same day of the comeback.

The EP was released in two versions; DE:code and Protocol Terminal.

Critical reception
"Dramarama" received critical praise, alongside its music video, with Taylor Glasby of Dazed describing both of them as "intriguing and alluring", noting the music video's concept of time travel with ambiguous meaning while praising the song's ability to highlight the "individual signatures" of the group members.

Listicles

Commercial performance
As of 2022, the EP had sold over 170,000 units in South Korea. It also peaked at number one on the weekly Gaon Album Chart.

"Dramarama" debuted at number seven on the Billboard World Digital Song Sales chart upon its release and the song "From Zero" debuted at number one in 2020. It had marked the group's first-ever weekly music show win, achieving it on The Show.

Track listing

Charts

Album

Weekly charts

Monthly chart

Year-end chart

Songs

Weekly chart

Sales

Accolades

Awards and nominations

Release history

See also
 List of K-pop songs on the Billboard charts
 List of K-pop albums on the Billboard charts
 List of K-pop songs on the World Digital Song Sales chart
 List of Gaon Album Chart number ones of 2017

References

2017 EPs
Korean-language EPs
Kakao M EPs
Monsta X EPs
Starship Entertainment EPs